Los Pelones ("The Bald Ones") is an enforcer gang originally part of the Mexican drug trafficking organization known as the Sinaloa Cartel, headed by the drug lord Joaquín El Chapo Guzmán, Mexico's most-wanted man.

Etymology 
Los Pelones literally means "The Bald Ones" in Spanish language; it symbolizes the "new soldiers" of the gang who shave their heads like military recruits.

History
The gang originated in 2004 in the state of Guerrero, where it distributed narcotics throughout several touristic spots in the state.

Beltrán-Leyva split and the Gulf Cartel alliance
After the death of Arturo Beltrán Leyva they went independent. On December 27, 2012, the group announced that they had stopped operating independently and that now they are part of the "honorable" Gulf Cartel. In June 2020, it was reported that Los Pelones was now an independent cartel due to the fragmentation of the Gulf Cartel.

See also 
 Mexican drug war
 Los Negros
 Beltrán-Leyva Cartel

References

 

Organizations established in 2004
2004 establishments in Mexico
Gangs in Mexico
Paramilitary organizations based in Mexico
Beltrán-Leyva Cartel
Gulf Cartel
Sinaloa Cartel
Mexican drug war